{{Infobox boxing match
| Fight Name = 
| fight date = 13 December 2022
| image = 
| location = Ariake Arena, Tokyo, Japan
| titles = WBA (Super), WBC, IBF, WBO, and The Ring bantamweight titles
| fighter1 =Naoya Inoue
| nickname1 = The Monster
| record1 = 23–0 (20 KO)
| hometown1 = Zama, Kanagawa, Japan
| height1 = 5 ft 5 in
| weight1 = 117.9 lbs
| style1 = Orthodox
| recognition1 = WBA (Super), WBC, IBF, and The Ring bantamweight champion[[The Ring (magazine)|The Ring]] No. 2 ranked pound-for-pound fighter3-division world champion
| fighter2 = Paul Butler
| nickname2 = Baby Faced Assassin
| record2 = 34–2 (15 KO)
| hometown2 = Ellesmere Port, Cheshire, England
| height2 = 5 ft 6 in
| weight2 = 118 lbs
| style2 = Orthodox
| recognition2 = WBO bantamweight champion
| result = Inoue wins via 11th round TKO
}}

Naoya Inoue vs. Paul Butler, billed as Undisputed, was a bantamweight unification professional boxing match contested between WBA (Super), WBC, IBF, and The Ring champion, Naoya Inoue, and WBO champion, Paul Butler. Inoue knocked out Butler and became the undisputed bantamweight champion and the first since Enrique Pinder beat Rafael Herrera in 1972. The bout took place on 13 December 2022, at Ariake Arena in Tokyo, Japan.

 Background 
Naoya Inoue emerged as the winner of the 2018–19 World Boxing Super Series, when he defeated WBA (Super) champion Nonito Donaire in the final via unanimous decision on 7 November 2019 to unify the WBA (Super), IBF and The Ring'' bantamweight titles. Inoue would defend his unified titles three times – against challengers Jason Moloney, Michael Dasmariñas and Aran Dipaen – before facing Donaire, who had since won the WBC title, in a rematch on 7 June 2022. Inoue prevailed via second-round technical knockout to unify three of the four major world titles in the bantamweight division and retain his undefeated record.

John Riel Casimero had captured the WBO bantamweight title on 30 November 2019 with a third-round technical knockout victory over Zolani Tete, and a unification clash between Inoue and Casimero had been scheduled for 25 April 2020; however, the fight was ultimately cancelled due to the COVID-19 pandemic. Casimero reigned as the WBO champion until 4 May 2022, when he was stripped by the WBO after twice failing to defend the title against mandatory challenger Paul Butler. Butler, who had defeated Jonas Sultan via unanimous decision twelve days earlier to win the WBO interim title, was elevated to become the full WBO champion, making him a two-time bantamweight champion, having previously held the IBF title in 2014.

Fight card

Broadcasting

References 

Boxing matches
Boxing in Japan
2022 in boxing
2022 in Japanese sport
December 2022 sports events in Japan